Balete may refer to:

 Balete people, a Southern African Tswana tribe
 Balete tree, a tree in the Philippines related to the banyan
 Balete, Aklan, a municipality in the province of Aklan, Philippines
 Balete, Batangas, a municipality in the province of Batangas, Philippines
 Balete Drive, a thoroughfare in Quezon City, Philippines
 Danilo S. Balete, Filipino biologist with botanic abbreviation Balete